Matthew McGahan (born 21 April 1993) is an Australian born rugby union player of Irish descent. His father played professional rugby league in New Zealand. Matt plays in the fly-half (and occasionally inside centre) position for The Ricoh Black Rams. and formerly in the Mitre 10 Cup for North Harbour and Australia's National Rugby League (NRL) rugby league club the Melbourne Storm. He formerly played for Yamaha Jubilo in the Japanese top League.

He is the son of rugby league legend, Hugh McGahan.

Early life
McGahan came to the attention of national selectors at the age of 17, after he was selected in the New Zealand secondary schools team against Australia in 2010. He attended Mount Albert Grammar School in Auckland, where he excelled in its first XV. Despite numerous approaches from rugby union while still at school, McGahan decided to take up a rugby league contract with the Melbourne Storm in the NRL's under-20s competition.

References

1993 births
New Zealand rugby union players
Rugby union fly-halves
Living people
North Harbour rugby union players
Blues (Super Rugby) players
New Zealand rugby league players
Melbourne Storm players
Shizuoka Blue Revs players
Queensland Reds players
Black Rams Tokyo players
Rugby union centres
Rugby union fullbacks